Derawar Fort is a fortress in Ahmadpur East Tehsil of Bahawalpur District in the Punjab province of Pakistan. Approximately 20 km south of the city of Ahmedpur East, the forty bastions of Derawar are visible for many miles in the Cholistan Desert. The walls have a perimeter of 1500 metres and stand up to thirty metres high.

Derawar fort was first built in the 9th century AD by Rai Jajja bhati, a Hindu Rajput ruler of the Bhati clan, as a tribute to Rawal Deoraj Bhati, the king of  Jaisalmer and Bahawalpur. The region was part of Emirate of Multan ruled by the Arabs. The fort was initially known as Dera Rawal, and later referred to as Dera Rawar, which with the passage of time came to be pronounced Derawar, its present name.

In 711 CE, the fort was captured by the Arab Umayyad commander Muhammad ibn Qasim. It was thereafter ruled by the Emirate of Multan which was captured by Mahmud Ghaznavi in 1008 during his conquest of the Punjab. The fort was then captured by the Ghurids under Muhammad Ghori and it became part of the Delhi Sultanate. The fort then came under the control of the Mughals from the early 16th century to the late 18th century. In the 18th century, the fort was taken over by Muslim Nawabs of Bahawalpur from the Shahotra tribe. It was later rebuilt in its current form in 1732 by the Abbasi ruler Nawab Sadeq Muhammad, but in 1747 the fort slipped from their hands owing to Bahawal Khan's preoccupations at Shikarpur. Nawab Mubarak Khan took the stronghold back in 1804. 1,000 year-old catapult shells were found in the debris near a decaying wall in the fort.

Nawab Sadeq Muhammad Khan Abbasi V, the 12th and last ruler of Bahawalpur state, was born in the fort in 1904.

This historically significant fort presents an enormous and impressive structure in the heart of the Cholistan Desert, but it is rapidly deteriorating and in need of immediate preventive measures for preservation.

See also
List of UNESCO World Heritage Sites in Pakistan
List of forts in Pakistan
List of museums in Pakistan

References

External links

Derawar Fort
ContactPakistan.com - Derawar Fort Page 
Derawar Fort, The Large Square Fortress in Pakistan 

Rajput architecture
Forts in Punjab, Pakistan
Infrastructure completed in 1733
Palaces in Pakistan
Buildings and structures in Bahawalpur District
Tourist attractions in Punjab, Pakistan